Sayyidat Nisa' al-Alamin is a title of Fatima, daughter of the Islamic prophet Muhammad. She is recognized by this title and by Sayyidat Nisa' al-Janna in Shia and Sunni collections of hadith, including the canonical Sunni Sahih al-Bukhari and Sahih Muslim. In particular, the hadith in Sahih al-Bukhari is narrated from Muhammad's wife Aisha. Muhammad is also said to have listed Fatima, Khadija, Mary, and Asiya as the four outstanding women of all time, according to the Shia Abu al-Futuh al-Razi and the Sunni Fakhr al-Din al-Razi, among others.

See also 

Book of Fatima
Muhammad's children
Sermon of Fadak

References

Sources

External links 
 Fatima, the Daughter of Muhammad, a Brief Biography
 Some Virtues of Sayyidah Fatimah al-Zahra

Fatimah